Mississippi Highway 309 (MS 309) is a two-lane, north–south state highway in Marshall County, Mississippi. It runs  from the Tennessee state line south through western Marshall County to its southern terminus at MS 4, just east of the community of Chulahoma.

Route description

MS 309 begins at the western edge of the community of Chulahoma at an intersection with MS 4. It winds its way northwest through a mix of farmland and wooded areas for several miles, where it makes both a sharp left, and a sharp right, as it passes through the community of Watson. The highway now enters the town of Byhalia at an interchange with Interstate 22 (I-22)/U.S. Route 78 (US 78) at their exit 14, and it travels through some neighborhoods before passing directly through downtown, where it has an intersection with MS 178. MS 309 leaves downtown as it crosses a railroad track, traveling north through more neighborhoods before leaving Byhalia at an interchange with I-269/MS 304 (exit 18). The highway travels northward through farmland to cross the Coldwater River and pass through the community of Barton, where it has an intersection with MS 302, before coming to an end at the Tennessee state line, with the road continuing north as Byhalia Road into the city of Collierville.

The entire length of Mississippi Highway 309 is a rural two-lane state highway, located entirely in Marshall County.

Major intersections

References

External links

309
Transportation in Marshall County, Mississippi